Complete Best is a greatest hits album by Canadian singer Celine Dion, released exclusively in Japan on 27 February 2008. It reached number three on the Oricon Albums Chart, was certified Gold by the RIAJ and has sold 173,100 copies in Japan in 2008.

Background
Complete Best was released just a few days before Dion's sold-out concerts in Japan, which were a part of the Taking Chances World Tour. The compilation includes "To Love You More," which was originally released in October 1995 and became Dion's biggest hit in Japan, topping the singles chart for four weeks and selling 1.5 million copies. It also features two other singles exclusive to Japan: "The Power of the Dream" and "Be the Man", as well as many of Dion's other hits.

The new single, "A World to Believe In" (U.S.A. Mix), was included as the first track of the compilation. Recorded as an English-Japanese duet with Yuna Ito, the song was released in January 2008, peaking at number eight on the Oricon Singles Chart. It was Dion's first appearance on the chart since "To Love You More" (Dance Mixes) entered it in April 1999. The duet wasn't available on Dion's previous album, Taking Chances, which includes the original English solo version of the song.

In October 2008, another greatest hits album was released internationally, titled My Love: Essential Collection. Due to the recent release of Complete Best, this compilation was not released in Japan. However, new unreleased tracks from My Love: Essential Collection were instead included on the CD single A World to Believe In: Himiko Fantasia, released in Japan at the same time.

On 22 July 2009 the album was reissued in Blu-spec CD format also in Japan.

Commercial performance
Complete Best debuted at number three on the Oricon Albums Chart, selling 34,223 copies. In the second week, it fell to number six selling 27,281 units. The following week, right after the Japanese leg of the Taking Chances World Tour, Complete Best jumped to number four with sales of 34,724 copies. In the fourth week, the album fell to number six and sold 16,304 units. Later it went down to number twelve (11,040 copies) and sixteen (7,956 copies). During these six consecutive weeks, Complete Best occupied the top position on the Oricon International Albums Chart. Shortly after release, Complete Best was certified Gold by the RIAJ. It has sold 173,100 copies in Japan in 2008.

Track listing

Notes
  signifies a co-producer
  signifies an additional producer

Charts

Weekly charts

Year-end charts

Certifications and sales

|}

Release history

Ultimate Box
On 27 February 2008, Sony Music Entertainment Japan also released Ultimate Box in limited edition. This five-disc box set includes two CD albums (Taking Chances and Complete Best) and three DVDs (Live in Las Vegas: A New Day..., All the Way... A Decade of Song & Video expanded with six  additional music videos and Taking Chances Recording Sessions). Ultimate Box peaked at number 109 on the Oricon Albums Chart in Japan in March 2008, and number 27 on the International Oricon Albums Chart.

Track listing

References

External links
 
 

2008 greatest hits albums
Albums produced by Christopher Neil
Albums produced by David Foster
Albums produced by Jim Steinman
Albums produced by Max Martin
Albums produced by R. Kelly
Albums produced by Ric Wake
Albums produced by Roy Bittan
Albums produced by Steven Rinkoff
Albums produced by Walter Afanasieff
Celine Dion compilation albums